Neoephemera maxima is a species of mayfly belonging to the family Neoephemeridae.

It is native to Europe.

Synonym:
 Leucorhoenanthus maximus

References

Mayflies